Yaco Municipality is the third municipal section of the Loayza Province in the  La Paz Department, Bolivia. Its seat is Yaco.

Villages 
In addition to Yaco, the municipality comprises a number of villages, among which:

 Caxata
 Chucamarca

See also 
 Jach'a Jawira
 Wila Pukara
 Wisk'achani

References 

  Instituto Nacional de Estadistica de Bolivia  (INE)

Municipalities of La Paz Department (Bolivia)